Hagart may refer to:

Charles Hagart, a British Army officer
John Hagart, a Scottish association football player and manager
Hagart-Alexander baronets, a title in the Baronetage of the United Kingdom

See also
Hagar (disambiguation)
Haggart, a surname